Tacitus is a lunar impact crater located to the northwest of the crater Catharina, at the northern extension of the Rupes Altai ridge line. It was named after the 1st century Roman historian and writer Tacitus. Directly west is the crater Almanon, and to the northeast is Cyrillus. To the southeast of Tacitus is a long chain of craters named the Catena Abulfeda. This chain runs to the northwest from the eastern edge of the Rupes Altai, continuing for over 200 kilometers.

The crater terminates a ridge which forms part of the Rupes Altai. The outer wall has a small rampart, and the interior surfaces are terraced. The rim outline has a slight polygonal outline. There is a low ridge on the crater floor running from the north wall.

Satellite craters

By convention these features are identified on lunar maps by placing the letter on the side of the crater midpoint that is closest to Tacitus.

References

External links

Tacitus at The Moon Wiki

Impact craters on the Moon
Tacitus